Mount Carmel, Ontario, may refer to:

Mount Carmel, Prince Edward County, Ontario, Prince Edward County, Ontario
Mount Carmel, Essex County, Ontario, Essex County, Ontario
Mount Carmel, Haldimand County, Ontario
Mount Carmel, Middlesex County, Ontario